"Charmaine" is a popular song written by Ernö Rapée and Lew Pollack. The song was written in 1926 and published in 1927. However, Desmond Carrington on his BBC Radio 2 programme marked the song's writing as being in 1913.

Background
The song was originally in waltz time, but later versions were in common time."Charmaine" is one of many popular songs whose lyrics use a "Bluebird of happiness" as a symbol of cheer: "I wonder, when bluebirds are mating, will you come back again?"
The song was originally composed for the 1926 silent movie What Price Glory?

Shel Talmy produced the Bachelors version with Big Jim Sullivan on lead guitar and Jimmy Page on guitar.

Recordings
The best-selling version, recorded by Guy Lombardo & his Orchestra, spent seven weeks at the #1 position in 1927. It was featured in the movie Two Girls and a Sailor. A version was also recorded by the Harry James orchestra in 1944.
The 1951 instrumental arrangement by Ronald Binge, performed by the Mantovani orchestra with Max Jaffa as its leader and soloist, was Mantovani's first hit in the United States. Binge's "cascading strings" arrangement, using closely overlapping string parts that create an echo effect, became a trademark sound for future Mantovani arrangements. The recording was released by London Records as catalog number 1020. It first reached the Billboard chart on November 9, 1951, where it remained for 19 weeks, peaking at #10.
Another recording, by Gordon Jenkins' orchestra, with a vocal by Bob Carroll, also charted in 1951. This recording was released by Decca Records as catalog number 27859. It first reached the Billboard magazine charts on December 7, 1951 and lasted 1 week on the chart, at #26.
It was also recorded in a French version by Lucienne Delyle in 1952.
The Bachelors' version reached #6 in the British charts in 1963.
A 1952 arrangement of "Charmaine" by Billy May and His Orchestra reached # 17 on the Billboard charts.  The single was May's biggest hit under his own name.

Recorded versions
  
Jimmy Arnold
The Bachelors (recorded October 10, 1962)
Tex Beneke
Max Bygraves
Frankie Carle & His Girlfriends (1944)
Vic Damone (1962)
Billy Daniels
Tommy Dorsey & Orchestra
Gracie Fields
The Four Freshmen
The Four Knights
The Four Preps
Erroll Garner
Bill Haley & His Comets (1958)
The Harmonicats (instrumental) (1951)
The Ink Spots
Harry James & His Orchestra (1944)
Lewis James (1927)
Gordon Jenkins & His Orchestra (vocal: Bob Carroll) (1951)
Sammy Kaye
Lester Lanin & Orchestra
James Last
Layton & Johnstone
Michel Legrand
Julia Lee
Josef Locke
Guy Lombardo & His Royal Canadians (vocal: Carmen Lombardo) (recorded June 13, 1927)
Jimmie Lunceford & Orchestra
Mantovani & His Orchestra (1951) (recorded again in stereo in 1958; the stereo version is the most played version)
Billy May & His Orchestra (instrumental) (1952)
Moms & Dads
Vaughn Monroe & His Orchestra (recorded October 27, 1951)
Ed Bogas (1975; from the soundtrack to the film One Flew Over the Cuckoo's Nest)
Lou Rawls (1965)
Jim Reeves (1958)
Dorothy Ashby covered the song in 1958 on Hip Harp
Victor Silvester; his version was used as the title music for Dinner for One
Frank Sinatra (recorded January 15, 1962)
Ethel Smith
Cyril Stapleton & Orchestra
Hank Thompson
Arthur Tracy
Paul Weston & His Orchestra (vocal: Norman Luboff Choir) (recorded November 4, 1951)
Jackie Gleason & His Orchestra (1955) 
Gunnar Wiklund with Marcus Österdahl's orchestra. Swedish lyrics by Karl-Ewert also entitled "Charmaine". Recorded in Stockholm in 1967 and released on the single His Master's Voice EG 8698 on November 20, 1967.
Burnie Peacock and his orchestra (King Records, 1951)

Use in popular culture

The song appears in the background in the 1950 film Sunset Boulevard during Norma Desmond's house party. It also appears in the background in the 1978 film Just a Gigolo during a dance at the brothel run by the Baroness von Semering (Marlene Dietrich).

The Mantovani score of Charmaine was also used in Tony Hancock's Hancock's Half Hour in the episode "The First Night Party" in 1953 played whilst introducing the guests to a palatial home Sidney James discovered. It also appeared in the Series Six episode “The Childhood Sweetheart” as Hancock approaches his childhood girlfriend for the first time since school.
The version of "Charmaine" by the Mantovani Orchestra (the 1958 stereo recording) is used quite often in comedy to provide comedic effect whenever a romantic situation is created. In Monty Python's Flying Circus, as example, the tune has been used at least twice: in the Seduced Milkmen sketch from the first season; and in the third season, scored to scenes where soccer players who celebrate a goal start to kiss and embrace each other in a homosexual way.
A version by Victor Silvester And His Ballroom Orchestra is played during the opening and closing titles of the 1963 NDR production of the sketch Der 90. Geburtstag (Dinner For One) with Freddy Frinton and May Warden, which has long since become a staple of German popular culture, being rerun there on TV every New Year's Eve since the 1970s.
The song is also used in the 1967 film Thoroughly Modern Millie at the Long Island fancy dress party when the eccentric widow Muzzy Van Hossmere Carol Channing is introducing all of her "instructors" who also happen to be former lovers. The song is a recurring theme in the movie when referring to Millie Dillmount's Julie Andrews love life or lack thereof.
The song is featured in the horror  film The Abominable Dr. Phibes (1971), during a murder scene.
In the film One Flew Over the Cuckoo's Nest (1975) the tune is constantly played as background music in the mental institution.  The same 1951/1958 arrangement by Mantovani is used for "institutional" effect in Frank Darabont's 1999 film The Green Mile, in which it is heard as background music in the retirement home.
It can be heard during an early scene of 2011 film This Must Be The Place as the character played by Sean Penn is seen strolling through a supermarket.
It was also used as background music in the "waiting room" of the Alton Towers scare maze The Sanctuary.
It was referenced in the film Race For Your Life, Charlie Brown (1977) when Peppermint Patty plays a record, remarking to Charlie Brown, "I don't suppose you even know what a waltz is, do you?"
It was used in Part 10 of Twin Peaks: The Return (2017).
It appears on the sound track of the movie The Rum Diary (2011).

References

Songs with music by Ernö Rapée
Songs written by Lew Pollack
1927 songs
The Bachelors songs
Bill Haley songs
Song recordings produced by Shel Talmy
Decca Records singles
London Records singles
Guy Lombardo songs